Dargo may refer to:
 Dargo Department, a department and rural commune of Namentenga Province in Centre-Nord Region, Burkina Faso
 Dargo, Burkina Faso, the capital of the Dargo Department in Burkina Faso
 Dargo, Vedensky District, a village in Chechnya
 Dargo, Victoria, a small town in the state of Victoria, Australia
 Dargo River, a river in the Alpine and East Gippsland regions of Victoria, Australia
 Craig Dargo (born 1978), a Scottish professional football player and coach
 Haval Dargo, a sport utility vehicle also known as the Haval Big Dog